, which may include , ,  and the specifically female version, the , are a divine kind of spiritual beings found in Japanese Buddhism, the equivalent of Angels. They were seemingly imported from Chinese Buddhism, which was itself influenced by the concepts of heavenly beings found in Indian Buddhism and Chinese Taoism.

History
Tennin are mentioned in Buddhist sutras, and these descriptions form the basis for depictions of the beings in Japanese art, sculpture, and theater. They are usually pictured as unnaturally beautiful women dressed in ornate, colourful kimono (traditionally in five colours), exquisite jewelry, and flowing scarves that wrap loosely around their bodies. They usually carry lotus blossoms as a symbol of enlightenment or play musical instruments such as the biwa, or flute.

Religion
Tennin are believed to live in the Buddhist heaven as the companions to the Buddhas and Bodhisattvas. Some legends also make certain tennin solitary creatures living on mountain peaks. Pilgrims sometimes climb these mountains in order to meet the holy spirits.

Powers
Tennin can fly, a fact generally indicated in art by their coloured or feathered kimono, called hagoromo (羽衣, lit. feather dress). In some legends, tennin are unable to fly without these kimono (and thus cannot return to heaven). More rarely, they are shown with feathered wings. In a Noh play Hagoromo, which bears a number of similarities to the Western swan maiden legends, tennyo come to the earth and take off their hagoromo. A fisherman spies them and hides their clothes in order to force one to marry him. After some years he tells his wife what he did, and she finds her clothes and returns to heaven. The legend says it occurred on the beach of Miho no Matsubara, now a part of the city of Shizuoka.

See also

 Apsara
 Ceres, Celestial Legend
 Divine being
 InuYasha Movie 2: Castle Beyond the Looking Glass
 List of angels in theology
 Nymph
 Valkyries
 Swan maiden
 Selkie (Seal maidens)

References

Buddhism in Japan
Buddhism in China
Fairies
Japanese legendary creatures
Chinese legendary creatures
Female legendary creatures
Supernatural legends
Buddhist gods
Swan maidens
Angels